Bob Lane (born October 19, 1947) is an American politician. He was a member of the Georgia House of Representatives from 1966 to 2004. He is a member of the Republican party.

References

Living people
Democratic Party members of the Georgia House of Representatives
1947 births
21st-century American politicians